Pierce's Bridge is a defunct railroad station in Lexington, Massachusetts, United States. Its opening date is unknown; it closed on January 10, 1977.

References

Former MBTA stations in Massachusetts